Solar power in Gujarat, a state of India, is a fast developing industry given that the large state is mostly arid. It was one of the first states to develop solar generation capacity in India.

As of 31 March 2022, total installed solar power generation capacity of the state was 7,180 MW.

State solar policy

As of 30th of June 2022, Gujarat has an installed capacity of 19,414 MW of renewable energy, and includes 9419.42 MW of wind power, 7806.80 MW of solar power, 1990 MW of large hydro power, 109.26 MW of bio power and 89.39 MW from small hydro power.

Under the Scheme for Development of solar parks and Ultra-mega Solar Power Projects is underway with a target of setting up to 40,000 MW of Solar capacity.

In addition to the existing solar power policy, the state has also come out with a solar-wind hybrid policy, looking to establish four-five such parks with at least 2000 MW capacity.

Total installed solar power generation capacity of the state increased from 4,431 MW in March 2021 to 7,180 MW in March 2022.

Rooftop solar 
As of 30 June 2021, Gujarat has a total installed rooftop solar capacity of 1.27 GW with more than 2 lakh homes with installations. Gujarat is a top performing state in India in respect to rooftop solar.

Location of Solar parks

Solar Power Generation Report Statewide

Source: SLDC Gujarat

2011 Generation detail

2012 Generation detail

2013 Generation detail

2014 Generation detail

2015 Generation detail

2016 Generation detail

Project list

Source: GEDA

Gujarat Solar Park-1 

Gujarat solar park 1, also called Charanka Solar Park, is being built on a  plot of land near Charanka village in Patan district, northern Gujarat. So far, the park has witnessed investments of Rs 5,365 crore and generated 3,441 million units till date.

Installed generation capacity is at about 615 MW at present, having been commissioned by 31 developers in the Solar Park. GACL (Gujarat Alkalies and Chemicals Limited) is setting up 30 MW Solar PV plant, and GNFC (Gujarat Narmada Valley Fertilizers and Chemicals) is in the process of setting up 10 MW project.

The Gujarat Power Corporation Limited (GPCL), the project's developer, said in April, 2018 that further capacity addition of 150 MW taking the total to 790 MW may be opted for soon given the availability of land in the Park.

Projects of 95MW are under construction and 30MW under planning as of December, 2018.

See also

 Canal Solar Power Project
 Gujarat Hybrid Renewable Energy Park
 Solar power in India

References

External links
 Real time data

Photovoltaic power stations in India
Solar power stations in Gujarat
Energy in Gujarat